The 1989 Tour de Suisse was the 53rd edition of the Tour de Suisse cycle race and was held from 14 June to 23 June 1989. The race started in Bern and finished in Zürich. The race was won by Beat Breu of the Domex–Weinmann team.

General classification

References

1989
Tour de Suisse